Cryptocheilus is a genus of spider wasps of the subfamily Pepsinae, they are found in the world's warmer regions.  They vary in size from medium to large and are often strikingly coloured.  The females construct multicellular nests in cavities, once built each cell is stocked with a spider, captured by the female.  They are found in open habitats such as heaths, meadows and forest edges.

There are 24 species of Cryptocheilus known from Europe, 6 from North America and 2 recently described from the Neotropics.

Species
Selected species include

Cryptocheilus albosignatus Sustera, 1924
Cryptocheilus alternatus (Lepeletier, 1845)
Cryptocheilus annulatus (Fabricius, 1798)
Cryptocheilus attenuatum Banks 1933
Cryptocheilus australis Guerin 1830 Golden Spider Wasp
Cryptocheilus bicolor (Fabricius, 1775) Orange Spider Wasp
Cryptocheilus bruneipes Haupt, 1962
Cryptocheilus discolor (Fabricius, 1793)
Cryptocheilus dusmeti Junco y Reyes, 1943
Cryptocheilus egregius (Lepeletier, 1845)
Cryptocheilus elegans (Spinola, 1806)
Cryptocheilus fabricii (Vander, Linden 1827)
Cryptocheilus fischeri (Spinola, 1838)
Cryptocheilus freygessneri (Kohl 1883)
Cryptocheilus fulvicollis (Costa, 1874)
Cryptocheilus gazella Haupt 1962
Cryptocheilus guttulatus (Costa 1887)
Cryptocheilus hesperus (Banks 1915)
Cryptocheilus hispanicus Sustera 1924
Cryptocheilus ichneumonoides (Costa 1874)
Cryptocheilus idoneum Banks 1910
Cryptocheilus infumatus (Palma 1869)
Cryptocheilus juncoi Wahis 1986
Cryptocheilus limbatus Haupt 1962
Cryptocheilus minimus Priesner 1966
Cryptocheilus neotropicalis Cambra & Wahis 2005
Cryptocheilus notatus (Rossius 1792)
Cryptocheilus octomaculatus (Rossius 1790)
Cryptocheilus pallidipennis (Banks 1912)
Cryptocheilus perezi (Saunders 1901)
Cryptocheilus richardsi Moczar 1953
Cryptocheilus rubellus (Eversmann 1846)
Cryptocheilus sanguinolentus Haupt 1962
Cryptocheilus santosi Cambra & Wahis 2005
Cryptocheilus severini Banks 1926
Cryptocheilus strigifrons Haupt 1962
Cryptocheilus terminatus (Say)
Cryptocheilus tredecimmaculatus Haupt 1962
Cryptocheilus umbrosus Haupt 1962
Cryptocheilus unicolor (Fabricius 1804)
Cryptocheilus variabilis (Rossius 1790)
Cryptocheilus variipennis Sustera 1924
Cryptocheilus versicolor (Scopoli 1763)

References 

Hymenoptera genera
Pepsinae